Avenue Foch is an avenue in the 16th arrondissement of Paris, France, named after World War I Marshal Ferdinand Foch in 1929.  It is one of the most prestigious streets in Paris, and one of the most expensive addresses in the world, home to many grand palaces, including ones belonging to the Onassis and Rothschild families. The Rothschilds once owned numbers 19-21.
The avenue runs from the Arc de Triomphe southwest to the Porte Dauphine at the edge of the Bois de Boulogne city park. It is the widest avenue in Paris and is lined with chestnut trees along its full length.

History
The Avenue was constructed during the reign of Emperor Napoleon III, as part of the grand plan for the reconstruction of Paris conducted by Napoleon's Prefect of the Seine, Baron Haussmann.  It was designed to connect the Place d'Etoile with another important part of Haussmann's plan, the Bois de Boulogne, the new public park on the west end of the city.  The original plan, by Jacques Hittorff, who had designed the Place de la Concorde decades earlier,  called for an avenue forty meters wide between the modern Avenue Victor Hugo and the modern Avenue de la Grande Armée. Haussmann scrapped this plan and instead called for an avenue at least one hundred meters wide,  wider than the Champs-Elysées between the Arc de Triomphe and the new Bois de Boulogne.  Its purpose was to provide an impressive grand approach for fashionable Parisians to promenade from the center of the city to the Park in their carriages, to see and be seen. It was to be called the Avenue de l'Impératrice, the Avenue of the Empress, for the Empress Eugenie, the wife of Napoleon III.

The Avenue was built by Jean-Charles Adolphe Alphand, the chief engineer of the Service of Promenades and Plantations of Paris, who also designed the Bois de Boulogne, the Bois de Vincennes, Parc Monceau,  the Parc des Buttes-Chaumont, and other parks and squares built by Napoleon III.  The iron fences and lamps were designed by the architect Gabriel Davioud,  who designed all the distinctive ornamental park architecture of Paris during the period, from fountains and temples to gates and fences. The final design consisted of a central avenue one hundred twenty meters wide and 1300 meters long,  flanked by sidewalks for pedestrians, riding paths for horsemen,  and crisscrossing alleys, shaded by rows of chestnut trees and decorated along its full length by ornamental lawns and gardens with exotic flowers and plants. It was, in fact, an extension of the Bois de Boulogne, and connected directly with the avenues and paths of the park.

It opened in 1854, was immediately popular with Parisians, but it did not keep its name for long.  After the downfall of Napoleon III in 1870, the name was changed from Avenue de l'Impératrice to Avenue du Général-Uhrich, and then in 1875 to Avenue du Bois de Boulogne. It was changed again in 1929 to Avenue Foch, after the hero of the First World War, who died in that year.

During the Second World War, the street was nicknamed  « avenue Boche » by the Parisians ("Boche" being a slang word for "German"). The headquarters of the Gestapo was located for a time at number 72,  and the office of Section IV B4 of the Gestapo, the Juden Referat,  which was responsible for the arrest and deportation of French Jews to the concentration camps, had its office at 31 bis Avenue Foch. British agent Peter Churchill was tortured on the fifth floor of number 84. He survived the war.

The Gardens
The gardens of Avenue Foch occupy a space of 6.62 hectares, in the space 1200 meters long and 140 meters wide. In addition to the four thousand trees that line that avenue, the garden was originally planted with 2,400 different species of trees and plants, making it, as Alphand wrote, "a kind of arboretum".   Many of the original trees can still be found in the gardens, including a chestnut tree from India, 4.7 meters in circumference; from 1852, an elm tree from Siberia, 3.8 meters in circumference (1852); and a giant Catalpa tree 3.5 meters in circumference (1852).

The gardens contain a monument to Adolphe Alphand, designed by architect Jules Formigé, with sculpture by Jules Dalou. The monument was dedicated on 14 December 1899.

See also
 84 Avenue Foch
 History of Parks and Gardens of Paris
 List of most expensive streets by city
 Napoleon III
 Paris during the Second Empire
 Rothschild family
 List of streets named after Ferdinand Foch

References

Notes and citations

Bibliography

Patrice de Moncan, Paris- les jardins du Baron Haussmann, Les Éditions du Mécène, Paris, 

External links

 insecula.com: Avenue Foch 
 parisrama.com: Avenue Foch 
 paris.org: "Musée National d'Ennery / Musée Arménien" 

Foch, Avenue
16th arrondissement of Paris